Andrey Insunovich Pak (November 1926 – 1994) was a Doctor of Geological and Mineralogical Sciences, Lenin Prize winner.

He is of Korean descent. In 1951 he graduated from Samarkand State University. He worked as chief geologist, chief parties in Krasnokholmskaya exploratory expedition.

Member of the discovery and exploration of gold, silver, uranium, phosphate, turquoise, quartz sand, and others. From 1967 to 1994 - Senior and Senior Fellow, Institute of Geology and Geophysics, Academy of Sciences of the Republic of Uzbekistan. Candidate (1965) and Doctor (1984) of Geological and Mineralogical Sciences. Lenin Prize laureate of the year 1959 - for the discovery of uranium deposits in Uchkuduk. He was awarded the Red Banner of Labor Order and "Pioneer of the field" medal.

Author of the book: The Evolution of weathering crusts in the history of the Earth.

References

Sources
Photo http://koryo-saram.ru/geolog-uchenyj-laureat/
B. Lee. Coast of Hope. Tashkent Publisher: Niso Poligraf Year of publication: 201 Edition: 500 copies.

1926 births
1994 deaths
Soviet geologists
Lenin Prize winners
Soviet people of Korean descent
Uzbekistani people of Korean descent
Koryo-saram